Miloš Đelmaš (Serbian Cyrillic: Милош Ђелмаш, born 4 June 1960) is a Serbian former professional footballer who played as a midfielder.

Personal life
His cousin is rock musician Raša Đelmaš.

Honours
Partizan
Yugoslav First League: 1982–83, 1985–86, 1986–87

Hannover 96
DFB-Pokal: 1992

References

External links
 
 

1960 births
Living people
Footballers from Belgrade
Serbian footballers
Yugoslav footballers
Association football midfielders
Yugoslavia international footballers
Yugoslav First League players
Ligue 1 players
2. Bundesliga players
FK Partizan players
OGC Nice players
Hannover 96 players
Serbian football managers
Hannover 96 managers
Serbian expatriate footballers
Serbian expatriate football managers
Serbian expatriate sportspeople in France
Expatriate footballers in France
Serbian expatriate sportspeople in Germany
Expatriate footballers in Germany
Expatriate football managers in Germany